The 1952 North Dakota State Bison football team was an American football team that represented North Dakota State University during the 1952 college football season as a member of the North Central Conference. In their third year under head coach Mac Wenskunas, the team compiled a 5–4 record.

Schedule

References

North Dakota State
North Dakota State Bison football seasons
North Dakota State Bison football